The New Britain Museum of American Art is an art museum in New Britain, Connecticut. Founded in 1903, it is the first museum in the country dedicated to American art.

A total of 72,000 visits were made to the museum in the year ending June 30, 2009, and another 16,000 visits were made to the museum's satellite gallery at TheatreWorks in Hartford, Connecticut.

Walnut Hill Park, designed by Frederick Law Olmsted, is next to the museum.

History
The museum's origins are in the "New Britain Institute", chartered in 1853 with the goal of fostering education and art in the city, especially among its immigrant population. In 1903, the museum received a bequest of $20,000 from John Butler Talcott to acquire "original modern oil paintings either by native or foreign artists". Talcott's nephew was tonalist Allen Butler Talcott of the Old Lyme Art Colony. Bryson Burroughs, then curator of paintings at the Metropolitan Museum of Art in New York City, suggested to museum officials that directing their efforts at acquiring American art would be most cost-effective. The museum took his advice and seldom spent more than $1,000 for any artwork, amassing a collection now worth millions.

A wealthy widow, Grace Judd Landers, expected to donate a large amount of money to the museum, but she lost her money in the stock market crash of 1929, and so donated her house as a museum in 1934.

Sanford B. D. Low, a son-in-law of William H. Hart, at one time president of New Britain's Stanley Works, was the museum's first director. He acquired a number of works by his friend, Thomas Hart Benton, for the museum.
Both Low and Benton were part of a high-spirited circle of friends (including James Cagney) who spent summers at Hart Haven, William Hart's summer place on Martha's Vineyard where both Low and Benton painted together (Hart was no relation to Thomas Hart Benton). In the late 1940s, Low found out that the Whitney Museum in New York City was rumored to be ready to sell Benton's "The Arts of Life in America" series, which was out of fashion as representational art. Benton had believed he was cheated when he sold the murals to the Whitney's director, Juliana Force. Low arranged to have the New Britain museum acquire the works for $500, paid for by Alix Stanley, a member of the family which founded Stanley Works. The purchase price was less than it cost to hire a crane for the move and transport the pictures.

In 1964 the Sanford B. D. Low Memorial Illustration Collection was inaugurated. The first museum collection of American illustration in the United States, it now holds over 1,700 works dating from the 19th century.

Douglas Hyland became executive director of the museum in 1999 after having been director of the San Antonio Museum. He raised funds from new donors outside of New Britain, including the Walton Family Foundation and the Henry Luce Foundation. In 2003, the  Chase Family Building was constructed, doubling the museum's size. During Hyland's tenure (as of 2009), the New Britain museum building was renovated, and the museum doubled its collection to 10,000 objects, doubled its full-time staff to 24 employees, doubled its docents to 100 and nearly tripled memberships from 1,200 to 3,500.

The museum's $3.92 million in income for the fiscal year ending June 30, 2009, revenue was up slightly from the $3.86 million of the previous fiscal year.

Collection

The permanent collection includes colonial portraits, works from the Hudson River School, American Impressionists and the Ash Can School.  The collection includes works by John Singleton Copley, Marcus Jansen, Frederic Church, Thomas Cole, Rockwell Kent, Georgia O'Keeffe, N.C. Wyeth, Andrew Wyeth, and Sol LeWitt.

American Colonial and Federal-era portraits are represented with works by John Smibert, John Trumbull, Mather Brown, John Singleton Copley, Charles Willson Peale, Sarah Peale, Gilbert Stuart, and Ralph Earl. The museum's holdings of early and late Hudson River School paintings include landscapes by Thomas Cole, Thomas Doughty, Asher B. Durand, Fitz Hugh Lane, Martin Johnson Heade, John Kensett, Albert Bierstadt, and Frederic Church.

Nineteenth-century still life works at the museum include paintings by Raphaelle Peale, Severin Roesen, William Harnett, John Peto, John Haberle, and John La Farge. Genre painting and sculpture is represented by John Quidor, William Sidney Mount, Lilly Martin Spencer, John George Brown, and John Rogers. The museum's holdings in post-Civil War figural painting and sculpture, include works by Winslow Homer, Thomas Eakins, Mary Cassatt, John Singer Sargent, J. Alden Weir, George de Forest Brush, Joseph DeCamp, Frank Benson, Edmund C. Tarbell, William Paxton, Elizabeth Nourse, and 19 plasters and bronzes by Solon Borglum.

[[Image:Parrish-911-detail.jpg|thumb|left|The Cycle of Terror and Tragedy (detail) by Graydon Parrish. Collection of the New Britain Museum of American Art]]
Works by American Impressionists at the museum include a pastel by Mary Cassatt and works by Theodore Robinson, John Henry Twachtman, J. Alden Weir, Willard Metcalf, and 11 oil paintings by Childe Hassam. Among the later Impressionist works are paintings by William Glackens, Ernest Lawson, Frederick Carl Frieseke, Louis Ritman, Richard Emil Miller, and Maurice Prendergast.

The collection also includes the mural series "The Arts of Life in America" by Thomas Hart Benton. The museum's contemporary art holdings include works by Chuck Close, Dan Flavin, Eva Hesse, Julie Heffernan, Walton Ford, Ronnie Landfield, and Graydon Parrish.  Graydon Parrish's large realist painting The Cycle of Terror and Tragedy'' is also part of the collection.  The painting is an allegorical tribute to those lost in the  terrorist attacks of September 11, 2001.

The museum is the first to build a collection of Post-contemporary Art, centered around Parrish's 9/11 painting and including works by Tony Curanaj, Daniel Maidman, Richard T. Scott, Sadie Valerie, Stephanie Deshpande, and Patricia Watwood, among others.

References

External links

Buildings and structures in New Britain, Connecticut
Museums of American art
Art museums and galleries in Connecticut
Museums in Hartford County, Connecticut
Art museums established in 1903
1903 establishments in Connecticut